The 1974–75 NBA season was the Bucks' seventh season in the NBA. For the first time since 1969-70 season, Oscar Robertson was not on the opening day roster.  This would be Kareem Abdul Jabbar's last season in Milwaukee before being traded to the Los Angeles Lakers following the season.

Just before the start of the regular season, Kareem had privately requested a trade on October 3, 1974 at a dinner meeting in Downtown Milwaukee. His preferred trade destinations were the New York Knicks and the Los Angeles Lakers. General manager Wayne Embry later stated in 1987, "We asked Kareem if there was dissatisfaction with us and he said, 'no'. He just wanted to be traded from Milwaukee. He said his life style and the life style in Milwaukee were not compatible." With the Knicks failing to trade for Kareem in the 1975 offseason, the Lakers then traded for Kareem on June 16, 1975 in a trade that also sent Walt Wesley to the Lakers and Junior Bridgeman, Dave Meyers, Elmore Smith, and Brian Winters to the Bucks.

Draft picks

Roster

Regular season
With the retirement of Oscar Robertson, the Bucks started the season 1-13 before slowly coming back and after 48 games they were 24-24 and were poised for their 6th straight trip to the postseason, but the Bucks faded down the stretch and missed the playoffs for the first time since their inaugural season in 1968-69.

Season standings

z – clinched division title
y – clinched division title
x – clinched playoff spot

Record vs. opponents

Game log

|-style="background:#fcc;"
| 1 || October 18, 1974 || Houston
| L 101–106
|
|
|
| MECCA Arena
| 0–1
|-style="background:#fcc;"
| 4 || October 22, 1974 || Washington
| L 96–111
|
|
|
| MECCA Arena
| 1–3

|-style="background:#bbffbb;"
| 30 || December 22, 1974 || New Orleans
| W 96–76
|
|
|
| MECCA Arena
| 12–18

Player statistics

Awards and records
Kareem Abdul-Jabbar, NBA All-Defensive First Team

Transactions

Trades

Free Agents

References

Milwaukee
Milwaukee Bucks seasons
Milwau
Milwau